Walter James Treliving  (born 12 May 1941) is a Canadian businessman and TV personality who co-owns Boston Pizza. From 2006 to 2021, Treliving was one of the investor "dragons" on the Canadian television show Dragons' Den.

Career
Treliving used to work for the Royal Canadian Mounted Police. In 1968, Treliving noticed the growing popularity of Boston Pizza and purchased the rights to open a restaurant in Penticton, British Columbia. With George Melville, a chartered accountant and Treliving's business consultant and later partner, in 1983 he bought the Boston Pizza chain from Ron Coyle. By 1995, the chain had grown to 95 restaurants in Western Canada with sales in excess of $110 million. Currently Boston Pizza and Boston's the Gourmet Pizza (US and Mexico division) have over 435 restaurants throughout North America.

In 2006, Treliving joined the cast of the CBC Television program, Dragons' Den. Treliving was one of the "dragons", or potential investors in the business propositions made by aspiring entrepreneurs. He left in 2020. Treliving had been with the show for the first fifteen of its seasons.

Personal life
Treliving's son, Brad Treliving, is the general manager for the Calgary Flames of the National Hockey League.

Awards
 Canada Walk of Fame: 2019
 Order of Canada

References

External links
CBC bio
Official website
 

1941 births
Businesspeople from Manitoba
Canadian food industry businesspeople
Fast-food chain founders
Living people
Royal Canadian Mounted Police officers
Participants in Canadian reality television series
People from Virden, Manitoba
Members of the Order of Canada